Çaltepe can refer to:

 Çaltepe, Manavgat
 Çaltepe, Yeşilova